The 1940 Delaware Fightin' Blue Hens football team was an American football team that represented the University of Delaware in the 1940 college football season. In its first season under head coach William D. Murray, the team compiled a 5–3 record and outscored opponents by a total of 87 to 54. The team's victory on October 26, 1940, started a 22-game undefeated streak that was not broken until five years later on October 27, 1945.

Schedule

References

Delaware
Delaware Fightin' Blue Hens football seasons
Delaware Fightin' Blue Hens football